Ireland is one of many destination countries for women, men, and children trafficked for the purposes of commercial sexual exploitation and forced labor. In its 2018 and 2019 Trafficking in Persons Report, the United States Department of State's Office to Monitor and Combat Trafficking in Persons noted that Ireland had been downgraded from a tier 1 to a tier 2 country, meaning it was no longer meeting "the minimum standards for the elimination of trafficking but [..] making significant efforts to do so". The 2018 report highlighted "only three prosecutions" and "deficiencies in victim identification and referral" as reasons for the downgrading.

Legislation 
In Ireland, human trafficking offences are governed by the Criminal Law (Human Trafficking) Act 2008 and the Criminal Law (Human Trafficking) (Amendment) Act 2013. The 2008 act states that:

In 2017 there were reportedly three prosecutions under this legislation.

US State Department reports 
The US Trafficking Victims Protection Act (TVPA), as amended, requires the US Secretary of State to submit an Annual Report to the US Congress assessing the actions of various countries across the world in the fight against trafficking in persons.

The US State Department on Thursday released a report showing a 73 per cent increase in the number of detected cases of human trafficking in Ireland since 2014. Ireland still retained Tier 1 Status in the US State Department Annual Human Trafficking Report of 2015. Ireland's Tier 1 status means the country's controls met the minimum standard for the elimination of severe forms of trafficking.

As the Republic of Ireland had been assessed by the State Department as meeting the minimum standard for the elimination of severe forms of trafficking as set out in the US Trafficking Victims Protection Act (TVPA), (as amended) it retained its top Tier 1 rating in 2015. Ireland had been classified as Tier 1 for the previous six years.

As is the norm for all countries, including Tier 1 countries, the Report on Ireland contains a number of recommendations to be implemented going forward. These recommendations are addressed within the context of the development of the Second National Action Plan to Prevent and Tackle Human Trafficking across the world.

U.S. State Department's Office to Monitor and Combat Trafficking in Persons placed the country in "Tier 1" in 2017. However, in 2018 and 2019 the country was placed in "Tier 2". Other countries downgraded from Tier 1 to Tier 2, as of the 2019 report, included Germany and Denmark.

References 

Ireland
Ireland
Human rights abuses in Ireland
Crime in Ireland by type